Rea Rocks is a group of rocks in the middle of Arthur Glacier, 6 nautical miles (11 km) east of Mount Rea, in the Ford Ranges of Marie Byrd Land. Mapped by United States Geological Survey (USGS) from surveys and U.S. Navy air photos, 1959–65. Named by Advisory Committee on Antarctic Names (US-ACAN) for construction electrician Peter C. Rea, U.S. Navy, of the Byrd Station, 1967.
 

Rock formations of Marie Byrd Land